Taeniopetalum is a genus of flowering plants belonging to the family Apiaceae.

Its native range is Eastern Central and Southeastern Europe to Turkey.

Species:

Taeniopetalum arenarium 
Taeniopetalum obtusifolium

References

Apiaceae
Apiaceae genera